André C. Denys (6 January 1948 in Gistel – 13 May 2013 in Ghent) was a Belgian politician who was the Governor of the province of East Flanders from 2004 to January 2013.

References

1948 births
2013 deaths
Governors of East Flanders
Open Vlaamse Liberalen en Democraten politicians